Gaétan Joseph Pierre Duchesne (July 11, 1962 – April 16, 2007) was a Canadian professional ice hockey player.

Early life
Duchesne was born in Quebec City, Quebec. As a youth, he played in the 1974 and 1975 Quebec International Pee-Wee Hockey Tournaments with a minor ice hockey team from Quebec City.

Playing career

Duchesne was drafted in 1981 by the Washington Capitals. He played six seasons with the Capitals before being dealt to the Quebec Nordiques in the trade that sent Dale Hunter to the Capitals.  He also played for the Minnesota North Stars, helping to guide them to their improbable appearance in the 1991 Stanley Cup Finals.

He later played for the San Jose Sharks and Florida Panthers.  In 1,028 NHL games, he scored 179 goals and 254 assists.

Starting in 2008, the Capitals have awarded the Gaetan Duchesne Trophy to the best intra-squad team in training camp scrimmages.

Death

Duchesne died of a heart attack at the age of 44 in Quebec City.

Personal life

His son, Jeremy Duchesne, is a former goaltending prospect for the Philadelphia Flyers.

Career statistics

See also
List of NHL players with 1,000 games played

References

External links

Profile at hockeydraftcentral.com

1962 births
2007 deaths
Canadian ice hockey left wingers
Florida Panthers players
French Quebecers
Hershey Bears players
Minnesota North Stars players
Quebec Nordiques players
Quebec Rafales players
Quebec Remparts players
San Jose Sharks players
Washington Capitals draft picks
Washington Capitals players
Ice hockey people from Quebec City